The Kiel Baltic Hurricanes are an American football team based in Kiel, Germany.

The club has been, of recent, a strong force in the sport in Germany, playing in five consecutive German Bowls from 2008 to 2012, losing the first two, winning the third, and losing the fourth and fifth.

The club is part of the American Sports Club Kiel e.V.

History

Founded in 1988, the Kiel Baltic Hurricanes first took part in competitive football in 1989, when they entered the tier-four Landesliga Nord. The club had some quick success, reaching the tier-two 2nd Bundesliga Nord by 1993. After back-to-back championships in this league, the Hussicanes played in the 1st Bundesliga Nord from 1996. This league would eventually become the German Football League. The Hurricanes reached the play-offs from 1997 to 2000, making it to the semi finals once, in 1999, but were relegated in 2002. The 2002 relegation round against the Dresden Monarchs was a particularly lopsided and humiliating affair as Kiel was shut out both at home and on the road by a combined score of 100:0. The second leg, Dresden's home game remains the best attended American football match ever played in Dresden. Dresden, the first team from former East Germany to reach the top tier in German American football, has remained a GFL1 member since and enjoys a fierce rivalry with Kiel whenever the two teams play each other.

Restarting in the tier-three Regionalliga Nordost, the club quickly recovered, playing in the GFL once more from 2007 onwards, now with much greater success.

The club came third in its division in 2007 and was knocked-out in the play-off quarter finals, but managed to win its division the following year. The Hurricanes managed to reach their first German Bowl that season, but lost to the Braunschweig Lions, who made their last of twelve consecutive German Bowl appearances, ending an unprecedented run of the latter club. (To date no other club has managed more than 9 participations in total - a number achieved by the Düsseldorf Panthers and Schwäbisch Hall Unicorns)

Kiel came second in 2009, on equal points with the Berlin Adler. The two teams met in the German Bowl, but unlike 2008, when Kiel had defeated Berlin in the semi finals, this time the club from the German capital triumphed. In 2010, Kiel once more topped its division and advanced to the German Bowl, once more against the Berlin Adler. This time, the Kiel Baltic Hurricanes proved the stronger and managed to win their first national German title. Their Head Coach during that time was NFL Europe alumn and former Hamburg Blue Devils player Patrick Esume.

Kiel won its division again in 2011, defeated the Munich Cowboys in the quarter finals and the Düsseldorf Panther in the semi finals of the play-offs and advanced to the German Bowl again where they met the Schwäbisch Hall Unicorns. The 33rd edition was the highest scoring German Bowl so far, ending with a 48–44 victory for the Unicorns, who thereby ended an 18-year title drought for the south. It was also the highest score achieved by any team losing a German Bowl at the time.

In 2012, the club once more won its division, only losing one game during the regular season away at Düsseldorf Panther, and reaching the German Bowl again against Schwäbisch Hall Unicorns, losing 53–56 in the championship game and topping the previous year's score. In 2013, the team came in on third place and was knocked out in the semi-finals of the playoffs by Braunschweig.

The club participated in the 2014 European Football League and won the inaugural EFL Bowl when it defeated the Badalona Dracs 40–0 in the final. In the GFL the club came fourth in the northern division in 2014 but lost 24–50 to the Schwäbisch Hall Unicorns in the quarterfinals of the playoffs.

In 2015, the Kiel Baltic Hurricanes competed in the EFL tournament and defended their title in the final against the Allgäu Comets. The team finished third in the northern division of the GFL and lost to the Allgäu Comets in the quarter finals of the playoffs.

Despite missing the EFL Bowl in 2016, the Hurricanes GFL season was more successful than the previous years'. The team again finished third in the northern division of the GFL, thus securing a playoff spot for the tenth year in a row. With a huge defensive effort the Canes won the first round (quarterfinal) against Frankfurt Universe 10–3 and advanced to the semifinal for the first time since 2013. Here, they lost 21–38 to the New Yorker Lions.

The 2017 season ended with a second place finish in the GFL North (behind Braunschweig but ahead of Dresden, who had placed ahead of them every previous season since 2013) but they again lost the semifinal to the eventual champion, this time the Schwäbisch Hall Unicorns.

In 2018 their fortunes waned and they failed to qualify for the playoffs, placing sixth with a losing 4-9-1 record.

2019 was an even worse year on the field as the team finished seventh, only two and a half games ahead of the Düsseldorf Panther who were relegated after a winless season. Their only wins on the season came against Düsseldorf and their sole draw was against the Potsdam Royals at home, who finished one spot ahead of them.

As the Covid-19 pandemic delayed and ultimately cancelled the 2020 season, it would be the 2021 which would show whether Kiel's on field product had much improved. While the 'canes won an upset victory at home against the New Yorker Lions and also defeated the Berlin Rebels on the Moorteichwiese, those were their only wins in a season they finished fifth out of six teams in the North with a record of 2-8-0 (The failed negotiations between the European League of Football and the Hildesheim Invaders as well as the Elmshorn Fighting Pirates led to those teams withdrawing without a replacement, thus the GFL North had only six instead of the "normal" eight teams that year).

Honours
 EFL Bowl
 Champions: 2014, 2015
 German Bowl
 Champions: 2010
 Runners-up: (4) 2008, 2009, 2011, 2012
 EFL
 Participations: 2011, 2014
 GFL
 Northern Division champions: (4) 2008, 2010, 2011, 2012
 Play-off qualification : (15) 1997–2000, 2007–2017
 League membership : (22) 1996–2002, 2007–present
 GFL2
 Northern Division champions: 1994, 1995, 2005, 2006

German Bowl appearances
The club's appearances in the German Bowl:

Recent seasons
Recent seasons of the Kiel Baltic Hurricanes:

 RR = Relegation round.
 QF = Quarter finals.
 SF = Semi finals.
 GB = German Bowl.

References

External links

  Official website
  German Football League official website
  Football History Historic American football tables from Germany

American football teams in Germany
German Football League teams
American football teams established in 1988
Sport in Kiel
1988 establishments in West Germany